Ilex uraiensis is a species of plant in the family Aquifoliaceae. It is endemic to Taiwan.

References

Endangered plants
Endemic flora of Taiwan
uraiensis
Taxonomy articles created by Polbot